Veronika Andreyevna Andrusenko (née Popova) (born 20 January 1991) is a Russian competitive swimmer. 

At the 2012 Summer Olympics, she competed for the national team in the Women's 4 × 100 metre freestyle relay, finishing in 10th place in the heats, failing to reach the final.  She also took part in the 100 m freestyle (finishing in 17th), the 200 m freestyle (finishing in 6th place), 4 x 200 m freestyle (finishing in 15th) and the 4 x 100 m medley relay (finishing in 4th).

At the 2016 Summer Olympics, she competed in the same events, finishing in 19th in the 100 m freestyle, 9th in the 200 m freestyle, 10th in the 4 x 100 m freestyle, 7th in the 4 x 200 m freestyle and 6th in the 4 x 100 m medley relay.

In 2019 she was a member of the 2019 International Swimming League representing Team Iron.

She is married to Vyacheslav Andrusenko, who is also a swimmer for Russia.

References

1991 births
Living people
Russian female swimmers
Olympic swimmers of Russia
Swimmers at the 2012 Summer Olympics
Swimmers at the 2016 Summer Olympics
Russian female freestyle swimmers
Medalists at the FINA World Swimming Championships (25 m)
World Aquatics Championships medalists in swimming
Sportspeople from Volgograd
Universiade gold medalists for Russia
Universiade silver medalists for Russia
Universiade medalists in swimming
Swimmers at the 2020 Summer Olympics
20th-century Russian women
21st-century Russian women